A human pyramid is an acrobatic formation of three or more people in which two or more people support a tier of higher people, who in turn may support other, higher tiers of people. People above the bottom tier may kneel or stand on the shoulders, backs or thighs of the people below them. Typically, the number of people in each tier is one greater than the tier immediately above it, resulting in a triangular structure reminiscent of the formation's namesake.

For practical reasons, lighter people are often positioned higher in the formation and stronger, heavier people are located closer to the base. Human pyramids are performed in various activities, including cheerleading and in circus acrobatics.

Traditions involving human pyramids

China
 Human pyramids are often formed to reach for the bun during the Chinese Bun Festival.

Czech Republic

 Sokol is a youth sport movement and gymnastics organization founded in Czech region of Austria-Hungary, Prague, in 1862. It was primarily a fitness training center for the nation. The movement also spread across other Slavic regions. Some of the Sokol exercises included human pyramids.

India

 During the Hindu festival Krishna Janmashtami in Maharashtra, young men form human pyramids to reach pots filled with curd and butter and suspended high above the ground as part of the Dahi Handi ritual.

Spain
Algemesí holds a Human Pyramid Festival annually on September 8 as a component of the Fiesta de La Virgen de la Salud (Virgin of Good Health). The muixeranga, or acrobats, form the human towers.
Catalonia

 The "castellers" of Catalonia form human pyramids, named castells ("castles"), up to ten men high. In Catalonia, severals statues commemorate this old tradition. In Tarragona the castellers form human towers during the Santa Tecla Festival in September and during the Sant Magi festival, held annually in mid-August.
 The Falcons are traditional teams in Catalonia who build human pyramids and towers. They follow different rules from the ones of the castells.

United States
 It is used in bonding, e.g. as part of a North American college fraternity hazing ritual, or in a variation called a spanking pyramid, suitable as a collective punishment, in which the pledges, often divested, are paddled on the conveniently protruded posterior.
Boy Scouts and Girl Scouts may hold competitions where the patrol that builds a human pyramid using all the scouts in their patrol the fastest, wins.
  University performance groups use human pyramids as large-scale acrobalance. The University of Maryland Gymkana Troupe keeps a tradition alive by building a series of pyramids during every one of their large shows.  The Washington Adventist University Acro-Airs create 3-person high pyramids while combining cheer-based skills and tumbling passes.

Veneto
In Venice until the eighteenth century there were human towers formed by Castellani and Nicolotti, inhabitants of different parts of Venice. Their human towers, maximum of 8 levels of men, were called Forze d'Ercole. At the top there was a child, usually called the Cimiereto.

Cheerleading

Cheerleaders may perform human pyramids with more difficult stunt sequences and gymnastics incorporated into routines. In cheerleading, pyramids are multiple groups of stunts connected aerially by the flyers. This connection may be made by simple linking of hands or having a multi-level pyramid. The flyers already in the air act as primary bases for another flyer or flyers on top of them.

Safety 
 Human pyramids at school sports days spark safety concerns the japan times SEP 25, 2014
Gymnastic Formation-related Injury to Children in Physical Education (※PDF) Journal of Nippon Medical School. Accepted, September 27, 2015
A scientific investigation of risk in large gymnastic formations(※PDF) Yutaka Nishiyama January-15 2017 NAID:120005972587

See also 
Gymnastic formation
 Acrobatic gymnastics
 Acrobalance
 Castell
 Muixeranga
 Human tower (gymnastic formation)

References 

Circus skills
 
Acro dance moves